Neofavolus suavissimus is a species of fungus belonging to the family Polyporaceae.

Synonym:
 Panus suavissimus (Fr.) Singer, 1951

References

Polyporaceae